Aeterna Noctis is an 2021 Metroidvania video game developed in Spain by Aeternum Game Studios. It was released in December 2021 for PlayStation 5, Xbox Series X/S, Nintendo Switch, and PC (through Steam and Epic Games Store).

Plot

Story 
The series narrates the story is about a pair of monarchs who, after being cursed with immortality, have been fighting and killing each other for eternity. But then, a revelation unleashes a chain of events that makes the monarchs find a way to break the curse and find love in the process.

Characters 
 King of Darkness
 Queen of Light
 Chaos
 Grey Soul
 Oracle

Reception

Legacy 
The second installment in the series, Summum Aeterna, a prequel to Aeterna Noctis, was initially released for Steam in June 2022, and will be released for PlayStation 5, Xbox Series X/S and Nintendo Switch in late 2023. The third installment in the series, Aeterna Lucis, a sequel to Aeterna Noctis, is set for release in 2024.

References

External links 
 Official website

2021 video games
Indie video games
Metroidvania games
Nintendo Switch games
PlayStation 4 games
PlayStation 5 games
Single-player video games
Video games developed in Spain
Windows games
Xbox One games
Xbox Series X and Series S games